Noor Hisham bin Abdullah (born Yew Ming Seong; 21 April 1963) is a Malaysian civil servant and endocrine surgeon who has served as the Director-General of Health since March 2013. Prior to his appointment, he served as the Deputy Director General of Health (Medical) from February 2008 to March 2013.

Noor Hisham is also the current Chairman of the World Health Organization (WHO) Standing Committee on Health Emergency Prevention, Preparedness and Response (SCHEPPR), President of Malaysia Medical Council (MMC), as well as member of the Board of Directors of the Drug for Neglected Diseases Initiative (DNDi). In his role, he has been prominent in leading Malaysia's response to the COVID-19 pandemic.

Early life and education
Born as Yew Ming Seong on 21 April 1963 in Sepang, Selangor to a poor Chinese family of Fuzhou people descent, he spent his childhood in a kampung at Sungai Pelek. He was raised by his single mother after his parents separated since birth and had lived in the off Jalan Loke Yew's San Peng Flats, Pudu, Kuala Lumpur. As a young school boy, he would walk with his younger sibling to the Methodist Boys' School (MBS) in Jalan Davidson where he acquired his early education.

Forced by his family's poor condition, Yew was then adopted by an Ustaz who was the principal of the Kolej Islam Klang (KIK) where he continued his upper secondary studies before continuing his pre-university education at Sekolah Sultan Alam Shah (SAS), Cheras. Later he married his adoptive father's biological daughter; at about that time, he changed his name to Noor Hisham Abdullah.

Yew also had obtained a medical doctorate degree in 1988 and a Master in Surgery in 1994, both from National University of Malaysia (UKM). He went on to specialise in endocrine surgery and did his training in various universities in Adelaide and Sydney, Australia.

Medical career

Medical practice (since 1988) 
Dr. Noor Hisham started his medical career as a houseman at the Kuala Lumpur University Hospital in 1988, and later specialising in the Accident and Emergency Department in 1989.

After he received his Master of Surgery, he became a general surgeon in Hospital Terengganu in 1994. After 3 years as a general surgeon, Dr Noor Hisham received an endocrinology fellowship training at various institutes in Australia.

After completing his fellowship training, Dr. Noor Hisham was appointed as the Head of the Breast and Endocrine Surgery Unit at the Kuala Lumpur Hospital in 1999. Three years later, in 2002, he took on the role of Head and Senior Consultant of Breast and Endocrine Surgery at Putrajaya Hospital, a position that he currently holds.

Noor Hisham has received the Excellent Service Award (2000), Kuala Lumpur Hospital (HKL) and Excellent Service Award (2004), Federal Territories Kuala Lumpur and Putrajaya Health Department (JKWPKL) for the recognition of his service in a medical career.

Director-General of Health (since 2013) 
Noor Hisham served as the Deputy Director-General of Health (Medical) for 5 years from February 2008 before being promoted and prior to serving as the Director-General of Health in March 2013.

Role during the COVID-19 pandemic in Malaysia
Dr. Noor Hisham is the director-general in charge during the COVID-19 pandemic in Malaysia. Following the 2020 Malaysian political crisis, Noor Hisham took over from press briefings after new Health Minister Adham Baba gave a widely criticized first briefing where he falsely claimed that warm water can protect from COVID-19. Noor Hisham's briefings were praised for their calm and clarity during the crisis.

In April 2020, he was picked to join an international coalition dedicated to clinical research involving COVID-19. The China Global TV Network (CGTN), had recognised Dr Noor Hisham as among the “top doctors” of the world alongside America's Dr Anthony Fauci and New Zealand's Dr Ashley Bloomfield for the handling of COVID-19 pandemic approach. He also was named again among the COVID-19 heroic trio by Singaporean news outlet, The Independent.

Recognition and accolades 
On 4 July 2020, Noor Hisham was awarded the '2019 Most Notable Alumni' by his alma mater UKM's Medical Faculty. On 17 July, he received the BrandLaureate Award 2020 for Outstanding Brand Leadership along with the 'Certificate of Recognition and Appreciation' for Ministry of Health by the World Brand Foundation. On 19 August, he was named as the recipient of the national level Maal Hijrah Figure Award 2020AD/1442AH. Noor Hisham received the Rotary Club's Paul Harris Fellowship, the highest honour given by them to individuals who have contributed to good causes, from the club Kuala Lumpur chapter on 13 September.
On 18 December, women's magazine Nona honoured him with a special Nona Frontliner Award during the Nona Superwoman Award 2020 presentation. On 20 December, he was presented a special award during the Anugerah MeleTOP Era 2020 (AME 2020) jointly hosted by Astro's both MeleTOP television entertainment programme and ERA radio station.

On 18 March 2021, a year since the first COVID-19 pandemic Movement Control Order (MCO) imposed, in which he spearheaded the fight against, Noor Hisham received the Ibn Khaldun Merit Award by International Islamic University Malaysia (IIUM) from its chancellor Raja Permaisuri Agong Tunku Azizah Aminah Maimunah Iskandariah. Noor Hisham received the International Surgical Fellowship Award from the International Society of Surgery (ISS) during the 'Virtual Surgical Week' (VSW 2021) held from 30 August to 3 September. On 15 December, the Nona magazine presented Noor Hisham again, who had received 2020 Nona Superwoman Award a year earlier, for the main 2021 Nona Superhero Award this time. On 18 December, Noor Hisham awarded 2021 Leadership Award by the Malaysia Public Relations and Communication Association (PRCA) to recognises and honours his dedication in giving interviews to keep the public updated.

In popular culture 
In October 2020, Noor Hisham appeared as an animated character along with characters from BoBoiBoy franchise in a one-minute public service announcement to remind Malaysians to take steps to prevent COVID-19.

Controversies and issues

Controversial political tweets and posts 
In 2018, Noor Hisham was criticised for his politically inclined retweets. These tweets were viewed as pro-Barisan Nasional, who were the then-ruling coalition during the 2018 general election (GE14) campaign. One of his retweets was a message by former Prime Minister Najib Razak's, containing a photo announcing the ceremony of the Hospital Kajang women and children's complex with a verse of his hopes for BN's return to the state power of Selangor. Prior to that, Noor Hisham had also retweeted another message from Najib that showed a picture of Najib on a visit to the Kuala Lumpur Hospital, sending that BN would implement more for mothers and children if it continues to be given the mandate.

Noor Farida Ariffin, a spokesperson for G25 (a group of eminent ex-civil servants of Malaysia), stated that Noor Hisham was abusing his position as public servants were not supposed to campaign for any political party. A founding member of G25 and former Treasury secretary-general, Mohd Sheriff Kassim said that the Ministry of Health should lodge a complaint against Noor Hisham to the Election Commission (EC).

The electoral reform group, Bersih 2.0, also gave criticism to Noor Hisham by stating that he was in breach of public service regulations. He was named in Bersih's 'Hall Of Shame' alongside Najib. Bersih has stated that they were appalled that the Ministry of Health allowed its Facebook page to promote BN's manifesto during the GE14 campaign.

SOP breach allegation 
On March 21, 2021, photos of Noor Hisham were circulated online showing him going against the standard operating procedure (SOP) of the ongoing conditional MCO. The photos display Noor Hisham and other family members standing closely without any face masks for a photo-op during a wedding reception of his daughter, Khairin Afiqah. As a result, Noor Hisham has been criticised online for not setting a good example to the public.

Ineffective health DG claims 
In July 2021, the former health DG Tan Sri Dr Mohamed Ismail Merican rebuked Noor Hisham as a "toothless tiger" for not being effective in leading the nation's COVID-19 pandemic management by failing to be firm with decisions, as well as being pressured by politicians. Dr Mohamed Ismail, who was the former position holder in charge of the 2003 SARS outbreak, opined that if politicians tried to interfere, they would be told to stay calm and stop meddling.

Personal life 
Noor Hisham is married to Nik Suwaida Nik Mohyideen and has six children; four sons and two daughters.

Noor Hisham having a lanky physique is an avid sportsman since his younger days. He was a school athlete, played football during university days and enjoys scuba diving including underwater photography. His hidden singing talent was revealed after an old video clip of him rendering the Shanghai Beach or Seung Hoi Tan (上海灘), a famous 1980s Cantopop song, resurfaced on social media. He is also known as a multilingual, being able to communicate fluently in English, Malay, several Chinese dialects, including his native Foochow colloquial, and even a little Tamil.

Honours

Honours of Malaysia
  :
 Officer of the Order of the Defender of the Realm (KMN) (2004)
  Commander of the Order of Meritorious Service (PJN) – Datuk (2007)
  Commander of the Order of Loyalty to the Crown of Malaysia (PSM) – Tan Sri (2020)
  :
  Knight Companion of Order of the Crown of Perlis (DPMP) – Dato' (2010)
  Knight Grand Commander of the Order of the Crown of Perlis (SPMP) – Dato' Seri (2013)
  :
  Grand Knight of the Order of Sultan Ahmad Shah of Pahang (SSAP) – Dato' Sri (2013)
  :
  Companion of the Order of the Defender of State (DMPN) – Dato' (2013)
  :
  Knight Grand Commander of the Order of the Crown of Selangor (SPMS) – Dato' Seri (2020)
  :
  Knight Grand Companion of the Order of Loyalty to Negeri Sembilan (SSNS) – Dato' Seri (2021)

Honorary degrees
  :
 Honorary Ph.D. degree in Leadership in Public Health from Universiti Kebangsaan Malaysia (2021)

References

External links

 Profile at Malaysian Health Ministry
 Biography
 Noor Hisham Abdullah at Facebook
 Noor Hisham Abdullah at Twitter

Living people
1963 births
People from Selangor
Malaysian people of Chinese descent
Malaysian Muslims
Converts to Islam from Buddhism
Malaysian surgeons
Malaysian civil servants
National University of Malaysia alumni
Commanders of the Order of Loyalty to the Crown of Malaysia
Commanders of the Order of Meritorious Service
Officers of the Order of the Defender of the Realm
Knights Grand Commander of the Order of the Crown of Selangor
20th-century surgeons
21st-century surgeons